Enhanced Imaging System (EIS), officially referred to as "Enhanced Imagery System", previously known as 8X, and sometimes unofficially known as Misty 2 and KH-13, is an American reconnaissance satellite program. A derivative of the Improved Crystal satellites, EIS replaced Misty, and was intended to provide more coverage and dwell time than previous reconnaissance satellites; like Misty, it has stealth capabilities. Only one EIS satellite has been launched; USA-144, which was placed into orbit by a Titan IVB rocket on 22 May 1999.

History
In 1995, a Los Angeles Times article reported that the 8X program was intended as "a major upgrade to the KH-12", with a mass of as much as 20 tons, which would be used for detailed imaging with a wide field of view. The cost of the program was a subject of disagreement from some within the military at the time. By 1998, the program had been renamed Enhanced Imaging System. The Future Imagery Architecture program, which was intended to replace the Lacrosse and Improved Crystal satellites, was developed alongside EIS.

See also
Corona series: KH-1, KH-2, KH-3, KH-4
KH-5 ARGON, KH-6 LANYARD
KH-7 and KH-8 GAMBIT
KH-9 HEXAGON "Big Bird"
Manned Orbital Laboratory (MOL) or KH-10
KH-11

References

Further reading
John Pike (July 24, 1998). 8X Enhanced Imaging System.  Federation of American Scientists. Accessed May 3, 2004 (October 17, 2001).
US space-based reconnaissance reinforced.  Jane's Defence Weekly.  Accessed May 3, 2004.

Reconnaissance satellites of the United States
Military equipment introduced in the 1990s